The Fox of Glenarvon (German: Der Fuchs von Glenarvon) is a German propaganda film from the Nazi era portraying the years of the Irish fight for independence during World War I. It was produced in 1940 by Max W. Kimmich and starred Olga Tschechowa, Karl Ludwig Diehl, Ferdinand Marian and others. The screenplay was written by Wolf Neumeister and Hans Bertram after a novel of the same title by Nicola Rhon (Maria von Kirchbach) that had been published at Ullstein publishing house in 1937. It was made at the Johannisthal Studios in Berlin, with sets designed by the art directors Wilhelm Depenau and Otto Erdmann. The shoot lasted from December 1939 to February 1940. It passed censorship on 22 April 1940 and had its debut in Berlin's Ufa-Palast am Zoo two days later.

Synopsis 
Set in 1921, the film takes place in the fictional Irish county of Glenarvon, somewhere in the northwest of Galway, and tells the story of Gloria Grandison, an Irish wife of the local British magistrate who falls in love with an Irish nationalist and leaves her husband for him.

Cast
 Olga Tschechowa as Gloria Grandison 
 Karl Ludwig Diehl as Baron John Ennis of Loweland 
 Ferdinand Marian as Friedensrichter (Justice of the Peace) Grandison 
 Elisabeth Flickenschildt as Brigit Erskynne 
 Traudl Stark as Kit Ennis of Loweland 
 Albert Florath as Baron O'Connor 
 Lucie Höflich as Baroness Margit O'Connor 
 Else von Möllendorff as Mary-Ann O'Connor 
 Richard Häussler as Major McKenney 
 Ellen Bang as Lady McKenney 
 Curt Lucas as Bankier (Bank Manager) Beverly 
 Werner Hinz as Sir Tetbury 
 Hermann Braun as Desmond O'Morrow 
 Hans Mierendorff as Vater (Father) O'Morrow 
 Paul Otto as Oberst (Colonel) Stewart 
 Hans Richter as Robin Cavendish 
 Horst Birr as Rory 
 Peter Elsholtz as Tim Malory 
 Aribert Mog as Thomas Deally 
 Hilde Körber as Gouvernante (Schoolmistress) Maureen 
 Friedrich Kayßler as O'Riordon 
 Bruno Hübner as Mildon 
 Joachim Pfaff as Patrick Granison 
 Karl Dannemann as Pat Moore 
 Bernhard Goetzke as Duff O'Mally 
 Karl Hannemann as Strandvogt (Beach Warden) Thripp 
 Franz Weber as Hausmeister (Janitor) Donnelly 
 Albert Venohr as Polizist (Constable) Beardsley 
 Ferdinand Terpe as Polizist (Constable) Koph 
 Hanns Waschatko as Diener (Manservant) Morrison

Background 
Made at the beginning of the war between Nazi Germany and the United Kingdom, the film stands in a long line of anti-British propaganda films. Therefore, the love story is only a vehicle for the theory of the superiority of the "earthy" Irish race over the "rotten" British race, and as in My Life for Ireland, the British are portrayed as brutal and unscrupulous. The film, does not, however, operate on such crude anti-British stereotypes as such later films as Uncle Krüger and Carl Peters, which were filmed after Hitler and the Nazis had given up hope of making peace with Britain.

The Irish campaign for independence is also depicted less historically and more in the manner of the Nazi seizure of power, including the disruption of a funeral as in the film Hans Westmar.

Awards 
Shortly after release, the film was graded artistically valuable by film checkers of the Propaganda Ministry. This attribute was given to movies that fulfilled special aesthetic criteria besides the actors' performances and meant that cinemas had to pay less entertainment tax when showing this film. Even Goebbels was quite enthusiastic about the final movie: on 22 April 1940, he wrote in his diary: "Now it's great and very useful for our propaganda."

Further information 
The film was shown in many foreign countries, especially those that were allied with Nazi Germany, such as Finland, where it made its debut on 8 March 1942 under the title of Rakkaus voittaa kaikken. Later it was renamed there to Vapauden liekki, and in 1941, it was banned from the stages. The movie was also shown in Italy (La volpe insanguinata), Greece (I epanastatis) and even in the Soviet Union (Vozmezdie). After the war, it was banned by the Allies.

See also
 Nazi propaganda and the United Kingdom

References

Bibliography
 filmportal.de 
 Klaus, Ulrich J.: German sound films. Encyclopedia of full-length German movies (1929–1945), sorted by their German debut dates. - Berlin [et al.], 1940.

External links

Nazi propaganda films
1940 films
1940s historical drama films
Films of Nazi Germany
German historical drama films
1940s German-language films
Films set in Ireland
Films directed by Max W. Kimmich
Films set in 1884
Films based on German novels
Tobis Film films
German black-and-white films
Films shot at Johannisthal Studios
1940 drama films